N'Keal Harry (born December 17, 1997) is an American football wide receiver who is a free agent. He played college football at Arizona State, where he twice received first-team All-Pac-12 honors, and was selected by the New England Patriots as the final first round pick of the 2019 NFL Draft. Harry spent his first three seasons with the Patriots before being traded to the Bears in 2022.

Early life
Harry was born in Toronto, Ontario, Canada, before moving as a baby to Saint Vincent and the Grenadines. His grandmother brought him to the Phoenix metro area, with the blessing of his mother, to allow for more opportunity. Harry tried several sports as a kid; soccer, football, and basketball, among others. His grandmother had hoped he would choose a less dangerous sport, but agreed to let him play football. He starred at Chandler High School after transferring from Marcos de Niza High School in Tempe, earning five star recruiting honors from Rivals.com, and was noted by many recruiting services as one of the top wide receiver recruits in the country. In his junior season, Harry caught 13 touchdown passes on 30 catches for 657 yards.

College career
Harry chose to remain home and committed to Arizona State University despite recruiting efforts by Texas A&M, Oregon, USC, among other top-tier programs. In the 2016 season-opening game against Northern Arizona University, Harry became just the ninth true freshman in school history to start a season opener. In his freshman season, Harry posted 58 catches for 659 yards and five touchdowns. Additionally, Harry ran for 69 yards and scored twice, and completed a 46-yard pass of his own. For his efforts in his rookie year, N'Keal was honored by Scout, Football Focus, and Campus Insiders as a Freshman All-American.

During his sophomore campaign, Harry had 82 catches for 1142 yards and 8 touchdowns earning him First-team All-Conference honors.

Harry's junior season began with media accolades, as he was selected to the 2018 AP preseason All-American team. On Saturday, October 27, he made one of the greatest catches in football history according to Colin Cowherd. His acrobatic one-handed catch, along with a punt return touchdown, helped lead the Sun Devils to a win over the USC Trojans, cementing his legacy as one of the greatest receivers to don an Arizona State uniform. The following week N'Keal Harry scored three touchdowns in an upset over #15 Utah Utes. After the comeback win against the Arizona Wildcats on November 24, he announced that he would forgo his senior year and enter the 2019 NFL Draft.

College statistics

Professional career

New England Patriots
Harry was selected by the New England Patriots in the first round of the 2019 NFL Draft with the 32nd overall pick. He was the second wide receiver to be selected in the first round that year, behind Marquise Brown (Baltimore Ravens, 25th overall). Harry was also the first wide receiver that Patriots head coach Bill Belichick has drafted in the first round during his tenure with the Patriots and the first wide receiver the Patriots have drafted in the first round since Terry Glenn in 1996. On May 14, 2019, Harry signed a 4-year deal with the Patriots worth $10.1 million featuring a $5.3 million signing bonus.

2019 season
On September 2, 2019, he was placed on injured reserve as a result of the ankle injury he sustained during training camp. On November 2, 2019, Harry was activated off injured reserve. On November 24, 2019, Harry caught his first career receiving touchdown off a 10-yard pass from Tom Brady in the 13–9 win over the Dallas Cowboys. During a Week 14 matchup with the Kansas City Chiefs, Harry caught a short pass and ran into the endzone, seemingly scoring a touchdown on the play. However, Jerome Boger's referee crew ruled him out of bounds and the Patriots could not challenge the ruling. Harry left the game with a hip injury after this play. In Week 15, Harry caught two passes for 15 yards and a touchdown, and rushed two times for 22 yards in a 34-13 victory over the Cincinnati Bengals. As a rookie, he appeared in seven games in the regular season and totaled 12 receptions for 105 receiving yards and two receiving touchdowns.

2020 season
In the season opener against the Miami Dolphins, Harry finished with 5 receptions for 39 yards in the 21–11 win . In week 2, Harry finished with a career-high 8 receptions on 12 targets for 72 receiving yards against the Seattle Seahawks. On a week 4 Monday night game against the Kansas City Chiefs, Harry recorded his first touchdown of the year on a pass from Jarrett Stidham, finishing the game with 3 receptions for 21 yards and a touchdown.

2021 season
On July 6, 2021, Harry requested to be traded from the Patriots. In a statement from his agent, Jamal Tooson, it is stated that a fresh start "before the start of training camp" would be the best for Harry. In the preseason, Harry suffered a shoulder injury and was ruled out for four weeks. He was placed on injured reserve on September 2, 2021. After the release of Cam Newton, Harry switched from #15 to #1. He was activated on October 2. In Week 10, a game against the Cleveland Browns, Harry caught a 26 yard pass from backup quarterback Brian Hoyer. The Patriots would win 45-7. In Week 17, Harry was benched and made a healthy scratch.

The Patriots declined the fifth-year option on Harry's contract on May 2, 2022, making him a free agent after the 2022 season.

Chicago Bears
On July 12, 2022, Harry was traded to the Chicago Bears for a seventh round draft pick in the 2024 NFL Draft. He was placed on injured reserve on September 1, 2022 with an ankle injury. He was activated on October 10. Harry made his season debut on October 24 against his former team the New England Patriots.

NFL career statistics

Regular season

Postseason

References

External links
New England Patriots bio
Arizona State Sun Devils bio

1997 births
Living people
American football wide receivers
American Christians
Arizona State Sun Devils football players
New England Patriots players
Players of American football from Arizona
Sportspeople from Chandler, Arizona
Sportspeople from Toronto
Chicago Bears players
Black Canadian players of American football